Tilia mandshurica, the Manchurian linden or Manchurian lime, is a species of flowering plant in the family Malvaceae, native to China, the Korea Peninsula, Japan, and the Russian Far East. It is used as a street tree in its native range, and has potential elsewhere, but is susceptible to damage from late frosts.

Subtaxa
The following varieties are accepted:
Tilia mandshurica var. mandshurica
Tilia mandshurica var. rufovillosa (Hatus.) Kitam. – Only on Mount Kujū, Kyushu, Japan
Tilia mandshurica var. toriiana T.Yamaz. – Honshu, Japan

References

mandshurica
Flora of Henan
Flora of Jiangsu
Flora of North-Central China
Flora of Inner Mongolia
Flora of Manchuria
Flora of North Korea
Flora of South Korea
Flora of Japan
Flora of Primorsky Krai
Flora of Khabarovsk Krai
Plants described in 1856